Catherine Delachanal (born 4 April 1952, at Triel-sur-Seine) is a former French athlete, specialising in the  400 meters.

Biography  
Catherine Delachanal won three French champion titles for the 400 meters, two outdoor in 1977 and 1979, and one indoor in 1977. She twice set the French record for the 4 × 100 Metres Relay, running  44.2 in 1974, and 43.8 in 1976.

She participated in the 1976 Olympics in Montreal, where she reached the quarterfinals of the 200 meters and was eliminated in the qualifying heats of the 4 × 100 m.

Prize list  
 French Championships in Athletics   :  
 2 times winner of the 400m 1977 and 1979   
 Indoor Athletics Championships of France   :  
 winner of the 400 m in 1977

Records

References

External links  
 Docathlé2003, French Athletics Federation, 2003, p. 398   
 Olympic profile for Catherine Delachanal at sports-reference.com

French female sprinters
Olympic athletes of France
Living people
Athletes (track and field) at the 1976 Summer Olympics
1952 births
Mediterranean Games gold medalists for France
Mediterranean Games medalists in athletics
Athletes (track and field) at the 1975 Mediterranean Games
Olympic female sprinters